Arthur Lloyd Thomas (August 22, 1851 – September 15, 1924) was the governor of the Utah Territory from 1889 to 1893.

Biography 
Born in Chicago, Illinois, Thomas grew up in Pittsburgh, Pennsylvania.

Thomas was a staffer for US Representative James S. Negley of Pennsylvania; he came to Utah in 1879, upon his appointment as secretary of Utah Territory by US President Hayes.  His nomination for that position was confirmed by the US Senate in April of that year.

Thomas ran unsuccessfully in the 1895 election of Utah's first governor, held immediately ahead of the territory achieving statehood in 1896. He was appointed postmaster of Salt Lake City by US President McKinley in 1898, a position he held until 1914.

References

Governors of Utah Territory
Politicians from Chicago
Politicians from Pittsburgh
1851 births
1924 deaths